The 2018 RBC Tennis Championships of Dallas was a professional tennis tournament played on hard courts. It was the 21st edition of the tournament and part of the 2018 ATP Challenger Tour. It took place in Dallas, United States between 29 January and 4 February 2018.

Singles main-draw entrants

Seeds

 1 Rankings are as of January 15, 2018.

Other entrants
The following players received wildcards into the singles main draw:
  Patrick Kypson
  Kei Nishikori
  Frances Tiafoe

The following players received entry from the qualifying draw:
  Íñigo Cervantes
  Jared Hiltzik
  Evgeny Karlovskiy
  Jan Šátral

The following players received entry as lucky losers:
  Francesco Ferrari
  Dominik Köpfer

Champions

Singles

 Kei Nishikori def.  Mackenzie McDonald 6–1, 6–4.

Doubles

 Jeevan Nedunchezhiyan /  Christopher Rungkat def.  Leander Paes /  Joe Salisbury 6–4, 3–6, [10–7].

External links
Official Website

RBC Tennis Championships of Dallas
2018
RBC Tennis Championships of Dallas
RBC Tennis Championships of Dallas
RBC Tennis Championships of Dallas
RBC Tennis Championships of Dallas